A Little Romance is a 1979 American romantic comedy film directed by George Roy Hill and starring Laurence Olivier, Thelonious Bernard, and Diane Lane in her film debut. The screenplay was written by Allan Burns and George Roy Hill, based on the 1977 novel E=mc2 Mon Amour by Patrick Cauvin. The original music score was composed by Georges Delerue.  The film follows a French boy and an American girl who meet in Paris and begin a romance that leads to a journey to Venice where they hope to seal their love forever with a kiss beneath the Bridge of Sighs at sunset.

The film won the 1979 Academy Award for Best Original Score for Georges Delerue and received an additional nomination for Best Adapted Screenplay for Allan Burns. It also received two Golden Globe Award nominations for Best Supporting Actor for Laurence Olivier and Best Original Score for Delerue.  As the film's young leads, Thelonious Bernard and Diane Lane both received Young Artist Award nominations as Best Actor and Best Actress respectively, as well as earning the film a win as Best Motion Picture Featuring Youth. It was the first film produced by Orion Pictures.

Plot

Lauren King (Diane Lane) is a highly "book-smart" and affluent 13-year-old American girl living in Paris with her mother (Sally Kellerman) and stepfather (Arthur Hill). Daniel Michon (Thelonious Bernard) is a "street-smart" 13-year-old French boy who also lives in Paris with his father, a taxi driver. The two meet in the Château de Vaux-le-Vicomte, where Lauren's mother is becoming romantically interested in George, the sleazy director of a movie being filmed there, and where Daniel is taking a school trip, and they fall in love. Lauren and Daniel soon meet Julius Santorin (Laurence Olivier), a quirky but kind elderly man, literally by accident. Daniel is unimpressed by him, but he fascinates Lauren with stories of his life, telling of a tradition that if a couple kiss in a gondola beneath the Bridge of Sighs in Venice at sunset while the church bells toll, they will be in love forever. At Lauren's birthday party, Daniel punches George for making a crude suggestion about Lauren, and the two are forbidden to date by Lauren's mother.

Told her family will be returning to America soon, Lauren hatches a plan to travel to Venice with Daniel. Though they have money from a horse race (in which Julius actually loses the money betting on their chosen horse, but steals the money to take the trip by picking the pockets of the racegoers), they cannot cross the border without an adult.  With Julius's help, the pair travel by train but miss their connection to Verona after Julius gets into a conversation during the stop at the Italian border. In the meantime, Lauren's family spark an international investigation, believing she has been abducted.

They hitch a ride with a couple of American tourists, Bob and Janet Duryea (Andrew Duncan and Claudette Sutherland), who are headed to Venice. In Verona, the travelers go out to dinner together, where Bob discovers that his wallet has been stolen. Even though their winnings from the horse race were left on the train in Julius's vest, Julius offers to pay the bill with cash, perplexing Lauren and irritating Daniel, who suspects he stole it. The following morning at breakfast, the Duryeas notice Lauren's picture in an Italian newspaper, revealing her as a missing child. Julius has also seen the paper and intercepts Lauren and Daniel on their way back to the hotel, angry that Lauren lied to him about their true reason for going to Venice and that everyone will think he's a kidnapper.

Because they cannot go back to the hotel, they join a local bicycle race to escape Verona. Julius soon falls behind and Lauren persuades Daniel to go back for him. They find him collapsed from exhaustion. Daniel worms his background out of Julius, who also confesses that he both picked Bob's pocket and stole the money for their train tickets, disappointing Lauren. Lauren then reveals that she will be moving back to the United States permanently in two weeks. She wanted to take a gondola to the Bridge of Sighs and kiss Daniel so they could love each other forever. She berates Julius by dismissing all his stories as lies. Julius admits he lied about some things but insists the legend can be true. Daniel decides he still wants to go to Venice with Lauren, and Julius joins them.

In Venice, they spend the night in St Mark's Basilica, until a chance meeting with the Duryeas sets them on the run again hours before sunset. Julius hides them in a movie theater and gives them his remaining cash, promising to return a half-hour before sunset. As soon as they are inside, however, Julius turns himself in to police searching for them; despite being slapped around by an inspector, he refuses to reveal Lauren and Daniel's whereabouts. The two children fall asleep during the film and wake with just a few minutes remaining. Lauren and Daniel run to find a gondola, but most are already taken. They finally find an available gondolier; he takes them within sight of the bridge, but refuses to go further just as sunset arrives because they didn't pay him the full amount. Daniel pushes him into the canal and, as the bells of the Campanile begin chiming, the two pull the gondola by hand along the pilings toward the bridge, enabling the gondola to glide underneath. While the bells are still pealing, Lauren and Daniel kiss and embrace. In the police station, Julius finally reveals the two children's whereabouts, assuming they will have accomplished their goal.

After a few days pass, Lauren is preparing to leave Paris for home with her mother and stepfather. Moments before she's about to enter the car to depart, Lauren notices Daniel standing across the street, waiting to say goodbye to her. Her mother quickly objects to his presence, but her stepfather having warmed to the boy, allows her to go ahead and say her goodbyes.  Pledging not to become “like everybody else,” Lauren and Daniel share a final kiss and embrace.  She looks up and notices Julius waving to her from a nearby bench. She rushes over to greet him. Lauren embraces Julius and she tearfully bids him farewell, then runs back to the waiting car. Daniel follows after her as the car pulls away. They wave to each other for the last time, as Daniel leaps into the air.

Cast

 Laurence Olivier as Julius Edmund Santorin
 Diane Lane as Lauren King
 Thelonious Bernard as Daniel Michon
 Arthur Hill as Richard King
 Sally Kellerman as Kay King
 Broderick Crawford as himself
 David Dukes as George de Marco
 Andrew Duncan as Bob Duryea
 Claudette Sutherland as Janet Duryea
 Graham Fletcher-Cook as Londet
 Ashby Semple as Natalie Woodstein
 Claude Brosset as Michel Michon
 Jacques Maury as Inspector Leclerc
 Anna Massey as Ms Siegel
 Peter Maloney as Martin
 Dominique Lavanant as Mme. Cormier
 Mike Marshall as 1st Assistant Director
 Michel Bardinet as French Ambassador
 David Gabison as French Representative
 Isabel Duby as Monique
 Geoffrey Carey as Make-up Man
 John Pepper as 2nd Assistant Director
 Denise Glaser as Woman Critic
 Jeanne Herviale as Woman in Metro Station
 Carlo Lastricati as Tour Guide
 Judith Mullen as Richard's Secretary
 Philippe Brigaud as Theater Manager
 Lucienne Legrand as Theater Cashier

Production
Filming took place in Paris, France, as well as Verona, Venice and Veneto, Italy.

Reception
In his review in The New York Times, Vincent Canby described the film as "so ponderous it seems almost mean spirited. It's been a long time since I've seen a movie about boorish American tourists and felt sorry for the tourists—which is one of Mr. Hill's achievements here. I'm sure nothing mean-spirited was intended, but such is the film's effect. This may be the main hazard when one sets out to make a film so relentlessly sweet-tempered that it winds up—like Pollyana—alienating everyone not similarly affected." Roger Ebert of the Chicago Sun-Times gave the film two stars out of four and wrote that it "gives us two movie kids in a story so unlikely I assume it was intended as a fantasy. And it gives us dialog and situations so relentlessly cute we want to squirm." Dale Pollock of Variety wrote, "The first film out of Orion Pictures' stable, 'A Little Romance' emerges as a classy winner. A charming blend of youthful innocence and guile, though the George Roy Hill film will need careful marketing to find its desired audience, which is larger than many may suppose." Gene Siskel of the Chicago Tribune gave the film three stars out of four and called it "a beguiling light romantic comedy ... It's a credit to the film's young actors, director George Roy Hill, and the screenplay that we as adults manage to care for these kids." Charles Champlin of the Los Angeles Times stated, "If it's about something, I can't discern what it is. But the unpatronizing treatment of the young people and the strong appeal of the actors who play the parts make for an invigorating film." Judith Martin of The Washington Post wrote, "The intentional comedy in the film always seems on the verge of working, but then is quickly bludgeoned to death ... Several of the actors have genuinely satirical approaches to characters who are too weighted with clichés to allow lightness." David Ansen of Newsweek remarked, "In its sweet, witty and modestly sentimental way, it delivers the romantic frissons that many star-studded, would-be blockbusters of the heart lumber in vain to achieve."

In a retrospective review for DVD Movie Guide, David Williams called the film "one of those gems that doesn't seem too great on the surface, but manages to lift your spirits in such a way that when it's over, it makes you glad you ignored your initial feelings and checked it out anyway." Williams applauded the performances as "engaging from top-to-bottom", singling out Olivier's portrayal of Julius, the mischievous escort and matchmaker. In his review on Movie Metropolis, John J. Puccio wrote, "It's a lovely tale of pure and innocent love and the lengths that people involved in such a love will go to in their desire to ensure it. The movie can hardly fail to please even the most jaded audiences." In his review in DVD Talk, David Langdon concluded, "A Little Romance fits into that category we might call the children's film for adults. It's smart, well written, acted and directed. If anything it will be remembered as Diane Lane's first movie and one of Laurence Olivier's last. The DVD is above average in all categories except audio but it is worth a look."

On Rotten Tomatoes, the film has an approval rating of 71% based on reviews from 28 critics.

Accolades

The film is recognized by American Film Institute in these lists:
 2002: AFI's 100 Years...100 Passions – Nominated

Related Media
The Tamil film Panneer Pushpangal released in 1981 and directed by P. Vasu and Santhana Barathy was inspired by this movie.

References

External links
 
 
 
 
 

1979 films
1979 romantic comedy films
American coming-of-age films
American romantic comedy films
American teen romance films
Films scored by Georges Delerue
Films based on French novels
Films based on romance novels
Films directed by George Roy Hill
Films set in Paris
Films set in Venice
Films that won the Best Original Score Academy Award
English-language French films
French romantic comedy films
1970s French-language films
Orion Pictures films
Verona in fiction
Warner Bros. films
Films about puberty
Films about adolescence
1970s American films
1970s French films